Vasilika is a Greek toponym, meaning "royal place/land". It can refer to:

 Vasilika, Boeotia
 Vasilika, Euboea
 Vasilika, Heraklion
 Vasilika, Lesbos
 Vasilika, Phthiotis
 Vasilika, Thessaloniki
 Vasilika refugee camp

See also 
 Vasiliki (disambiguation)
 Vasiliko (disambiguation)